Tanjung Piai (Jawi: تنجوڠ ڤياي) is a cape in Pontian District, Johor, Malaysia. It is the southernmost point of Peninsular Malaysia and thus the most southern point of mainland Eurasia. The skyline of Singapore is visible across the Johor Strait from the point. It features seafood restaurants, perched on wooden jetties that are surrounded by a rugged and rarefied coastline of unspoiled mangrove forests.

0.33 nautical miles south of the point, at the edge of the dries, is a 15-metre light tower which flashes once every 3 seconds and houses a radar transponder beacon which transmits the Morse letter "M".

Tanjung Piai coastal mangrove is an internationally important Ramsar wetland site. Under the Ramsar Convention, the government and relevant stakeholders have an obligation to ensure the mangrove ecosystem and its values are maintained. Erosion at the site needs to be minimized to safeguard the ecological integrity of the mangrove ecosystem. The root causes of the erosion need to be eliminated or reduced.

Tanjung Piai is a nationally important icon, being one of only five Ramsar sites in Malaysia. Tanjung Piai is also an important nature site in Johor, being the 3rd designated park of Johor National Park Corporation. Tanjung Piai has high socio-economic value for fisheries. The site is a destination for ecotourism, attracting 32,360 visitors in 2006. The site is located on the southernmost tip of mainland Asia and is listed as a priority site for national ecotourism.

Tanjung Piai has 22 mangrove tree species. It is also an important habitat for migratory and resident birds. These include the IUCN-listed vulnerable species, such as the Lesser Adjutant Stork. It is part of the Important Bird Area (IBA) of southwest Johor, which extends from Sunda Trench to Tanjung Piai. The southwest Johor mangroves are ecologically important as a natural barrier for protecting the inland villages and agricultural lands from storm events, including tsunamis.

See also
 Extreme points of Asia
 Transport in Malaysia

References

External links 

 Tourism Malaysia - Tanjung Piai National Park
 Tanjung Piai by tourmalaysia.com

Geography of Johor
Extreme points of Earth
South Johor Economic Region
Nature sites of Malaysia
Ramsar sites in Malaysia
Pontian District